The Guardian is a lost 1917 silent feature film directed by and starring Arthur Ashley with June Elvidge and Montagu Love. It was produced by the Peerless Company and distributed by World Film Corporation.

Cast
Montagu Love - James Rokeby
June Elvidge - Marie Dacre
Arthur Ashley - Fenwick Harvey
William Black - William Donavan
Robert Broderick - Chief Conlin

References

External links
 

 lantern slide(archived)

1917 films
American silent feature films
Lost American films
American black-and-white films
World Film Company films
1910s American films